The Elizabeth D. Kay Environmental Center is located on a  site by the Black River in Chester Township, Morris County, New Jersey. The center was dedicated on October 28, 1993. The property, previously known as Hidden River Farm, was donated by Elizabeth D. Kay and her husband Alfred. The building is used as the field office of The Nature Conservancy in New Jersey. The Patriots' Path crosses the fields and forests of the property.

Gallery

See also 

 List of nature centers in New Jersey
 Black River County Park
 Bamboo Brook Outdoor Education Center
 Willowwood Arboretum

References

External links

 

Chester Township, New Jersey
Nature centers in New Jersey